Newry was a borough constituency of the town of Newry in the Irish House of Commons until 1800. After the Acts of Union 1800, the town was represented by one MP in the United Kingdom House of Commons.

Members of Parliament
1613–1615 Arthur Bassett and John Leigh
1634–1645 Arthur Terringham (Tyringham) and Robert Loftus
1639–1642 Sir Toby Poyntz and William Reading (both resigned and replaced 1641 by Thomas Stanihurst (expelled 1642)
1661–1666 Trevor Lloyd and Nicholas Bayly

1689–1801

References

Constituencies of the Parliament of Ireland (pre-1801)
Historic constituencies in County Armagh
Historic constituencies in County Down
Politics of Newry
1800 disestablishments in Ireland
Constituencies disestablished in 1800